Harry Edward Melling (born 17 March 1989) is an English actor known for playing Dudley Dursley in five Harry Potter films and for his role as Harry Beltik in The Queen's Gambit. His grandfather was actor Patrick Troughton.

Early life
Harry Melling was born on 17 March1989 in London, England. He studied at the London Academy of Music and Dramatic Art.

Career
In his early career, Harry Melling performed in stage productions of The Provoked Wife, King John, Antigone, and Plenty. He appeared in five of the Harry Potter films as Harry Potter's spoiled cousin, Dudley Dursley. He was first cast in the role at age 10, in 1999 and would play the character until 2010 and his appearance in Harry Potter and the Deathly Hallows – Part 1.

In 2009, he starred in a revival of Mother Courage and Her Children at the Royal National Theatre. He appeared in "The Sorcerer's Shadow", an episode of the BBC television series Merlin, playing a young warlock named Gilli who intends to use magic to help him win Camelot's legendary tournament. He also played Robert Brown in the BBC television series Just William. In October 2009, it was announced that Melling had lost so much weight since his last appearance in Harry Potter that he was now "unrecognisable". The role of Dudley was almost recast for Harry Potter and the Deathly Hallows – Part 1, but Melling was able to reprise the part by wearing a fat suit. He commented positively about the change, "I can now shed the child actor thing, like the fat, and start a new career, because no one sees me as Dudley."

In 2014, Melling made his playwrighting debut at HighTide Festival with his one-man show Peddling.

In 2018, Melling played alongside Liam Neeson in the Coen brothers' Western The Ballad of Buster Scruggs.  Of Melling's performance, New Yorker film critic Anthony Lane wrote:
[I] came away haunted by a scattering of sights and sounds--above all, by the recitations of the limbless man, which thrum with genuine yearning. He is beautifully played, with a little help from C.G.I., by Harry Melling, who was once the odious Dudley Dursley in the Harry Potter films. Funny how people grow up.

In 2020, Melling played evangelical preacher Roy Laferty in the Netflix thriller The Devil All The Time. That same year, he appeared in the Netflix series drama The Queen's Gambit in which he plays Harry Beltik, a chessplayer, friend and one of Beth's competitors in Kentucky.

Melling appeared in a Coen brothers film for a second time when he performed the role of Malcolm, the elder son of the Scottish King in the 2021 film, The Tragedy of Macbeth.

In 2022, he played a young Edgar Allan Poe in the 2022 film The Pale Blue Eye.

Filmography

Film

Television

Stage

Video games

References

External links
 
 
 

Male actors from London
Alumni of the London Academy of Music and Dramatic Art
English male child actors
English male film actors
English male stage actors
English male television actors
Living people
National Youth Theatre members
People educated at Mill Hill School
21st-century English male actors
Troughton family
Year of birth missing (living people)